William Edward Scott (17 May 1882 – 16 August 1936) was an Irish footballer who played as a goalkeeper for, among others, Everton, Leeds City, Liverpool and Ireland. In 1913 Scott was a member of the Ireland team that beat England for the first time with a 2–1 win at Windsor Park.  His younger brother, Elisha Scott, was also a notable goalkeeper and also played for Liverpool and Ireland. It was Billy Scott who recognised his younger brother's potential and recommended him to Liverpool after an unsuccessful trial at Everton.

Club career 
Scott was born in Belfast. After playing for Cliftonville and Linfield, Scott joined Everton in July 1904. He spent eight years at the club, playing 251 English League games and helping the club finish runners-up in the First Division three times. Scott also played a further 38 games for Everton in the FA Cup, including two appearances in the final. His team mates at the club included fellow Irish internationals Val Harris and Bill Lacey. In August 1912 Scott joined Leeds City where he played under Herbert Chapman and alongside another Irish international, Billy Gillespie. After leaving Leeds, Scott returned to Merseyside where he played 27 games for Liverpool during the First World War.

International career 
Between 1903 and 1913 Scott played 25 times for Ireland. In 1903, together with Jack Kirwan, Archie Goodall, Billy McCracken and Robert Milne, he was a member of the Ireland team that won a share in the 1903 British Home Championship. On 15 February 1913 Scott, along with Val Harris and two-goal hero Billy Gillespie, was a member of the Ireland team that beat England for the first time with a 2–1 win at Windsor Park.

Honours 
Linfield 
Irish Cup:
Winners 1901-02, 1903-04
Irish League
Winners 1901-02, 1903-04

Everton

FA Cup
Winners 1906
Runners Up 1907
First Division
Runners Up 1904–05, 1908–09, 1911–12

Ireland
British Home Championship: 
Shared title 1903

Sources

References

External links 
 Everton Appearances
 Leeds City 1912–13
Ireland career details

1882 births
1936 deaths
Irish association footballers (before 1923)
Pre-1950 IFA international footballers
Cliftonville F.C. players
Linfield F.C. players
NIFL Premiership players
Everton F.C. players
Leeds City F.C. players
Liverpool F.C. wartime guest players
Association footballers from Belfast
Association football goalkeepers
FA Cup Final players